Baricella (Bolognese: , locally ) is a comune (municipality) in the Metropolitan City of Bologna in the Italian region Emilia-Romagna, located about  northeast of Bologna.

Baricella borders the following municipalities: Argenta, Budrio, Ferrara, Malalbergo, Minerbio, Molinella, Poggio Renatico.

References

External links
 Official website

Cities and towns in Emilia-Romagna